The Yungas dove (Leptotila megalura), also known as the white-faced dove or large-tailed dove, is a species of bird in the family Columbidae. It is found in Argentina and Bolivia.

Taxonomy and systematics

The Yungas dove is monotypic. However, the southern population has sometimes been suggested as a distinct subspecies. The Yungas dove and the grey-fronted dove (L. rufaxilla) are sister species.

Description

The adult's forehead is grayish and its crown bluish gray. The eye is very dark and is surrounded by white feathers; the rest of the face is buff or pinkish buff. Its upperparts and tail are a dark ruddy brown with a purple gloss on the hindneck and upper mantle. Its breast and the sides of the neck are grayish pink lightening to white on the belly. The adult sexes are similar; the juvenile is duller and its wing coverts appear scaly.

Distribution and habitat

The Yungas dove is found in the Bolivian and Southern Andean Yungas on the east slope of the Andes of Bolivia and northwestern Argentina. It inhabits humid subtropical and tropical woodlands including secondary forest. It is also found in semi-arid Prosopis woodlands.

Behavior

Feeding

Details of the Yungas dove's foraging behavior and diet have not been published.

Breeding

Little is known about the Yungas dove's breeding phenology. It nests in bushes or trees, and the clutch size is two eggs.

Vocalization

The Yungas dove's song is "four (occasionally five) mournful monotonous notes on same pitch...'woooo-o-o-oooooo'."

Status

The IUCN has assessed the Yungas dove as being of Least Concern. However, it is "generally uncommon in much of its range" and its biology and ecology are very poorly known.

References

Yungas dove
Birds of the Yungas
Yungas dove
Yungas dove
Yungas dove
Taxonomy articles created by Polbot